Mízōngyì, or simply Mízōng, is a style of Chinese martial art based on deception and mobility. Mizong is also known as Mízōngquán ( or sometimes "Labyrinthine Boxing" stressing the deceptive nature of the art) and Yànqīngquán. There are many sub-branches of this style.

Mizong Luohan is a combination of two styles: Mízōngquán and Luóhànquán. Through Luóhànquán, its lineage can be traced back to the Shaolin temple during the time of the Tang Dynasty (618–907).

As an external northern Chinese style, Mizong belongs to the "Long Fist" family of martial arts although in some traditions Mizong is considered an internal art, created by Yue Fei, and taught as a precursor system to Hsing I Ch'uan. Mizongquan was created by Cheng Juxiao. Cheng learned from his maternal grandfather and mother, both of whom were also practitioners of Mizongyi.

The art began to grow popular since 1901 due to the deeds of Huo Yuanjia, a Mizongyi master. Huo Yuanjia's father, Huo Endi is a 6th-generation successor of Mizongyi.

Description
Mizong Luohan is an external style, with distinct internal influences.  It draws on many aspects of the external Northern Shaolin long-fist style, and the internal styles T'ai chi ch'uan and Baguazhang, which are often taught alongside it in modern times.  It is characterized by deceptive hand movements, intricate footwork, varied kicks, and high leaps.  The style changes very quickly when executed.

The emphasis on flexibility in Northern Shaolin Kung Fu styles is the guiding principle of Mizong, and this is evident in the versatility of its attacks and the extent to which it integrates core concepts of multiple internal styles.  

Mizong Luohan's system was presided over by Grandmaster Ye Yu Ting in the twentieth century until his death in 1962, at the age of 70.  A number of his students such as Masters Chi-Hung Marr, Raymond K. Wong, and Johnny Lee emigrated to North America in the 1960s and have continued to teach this system in various locations around the United States of America, from Los Angeles, Dallas, Texas, Coppell, Texas, to Hawai`i and Canada. 

Mizong Chuan has also been continued to be taught as a foundation art to Hsing I/Xing Yi within the Yue Jia Ba Shao/Geng Jishan tradition in London, England. Within this tradition, Mizong was primarily taught to children, as from a learning perspective the technical and internal aspects of the art are less sophisticated (i.e., more external) than in Hsing I.

See also
 Huo Yuanjia

References

Chinese martial arts